Horse racing in New Zealand consists of two forms:

 Thoroughbred Racing where the horse is ridden by a jockey
 Harness or standardbred racing where the horse is driven from a cart called a sulky.

Harness racing is sometimes referred to as trotting in New Zealand, although there are actually two types of standardbred races based on the type of gait or running style:

 trotting where the horse moves its two diagonally opposite legs forward at the same time, and 
 pacing where the two legs on the same side of the horse move forward at the same time.

The majority of standardbred races in New Zealand are pacing.

Famous New Zealand racehorses

Notable Thoroughbred racehorses from New Zealand include:

 Phar Lap, the greatest Australian racehorse
 Sunline, the best race mare in New Zealand
 Nightmarch, the first horse to win the Melbourne Cup and Cox Plate in the same year
 Rising Fast, the only winner of the Spring Grand Slam
 Tulloch, the greatest Australian stayer
 Carbine, the winner of 30 principal races
 Desert Gold, the winner of 36 races during WW1
 Il Tempo, the greatest New Zealand stayer
 Grey Way, who defeated every champion in New Zealand and broke an Australasian record
 Horlicks, winner of the Japan Cup in world record time
 Balmerino, a champion international racehorse

Famous New Zealand harness racers

The most famous New Zealand Standardbred is the pacer Cardigan Bay. Stanley Dancer drove Cardigan Bay to $1 million in winnings in 1968, the first harness horse to surpass that milestone in American history. Dancer and Cardigan Bay appeared together on The Ed Sullivan Show.

Other top Standardbred horses include:
 Robalan
 Young Quinn
 Christian Cullen
 Lyell Creek
 Lazarus

See also 

 Thoroughbred racing in New Zealand
 Harness racing in New Zealand
 New Zealand Racing Hall of Fame
 New Zealand Horse of the Year
 Glossary of Australian and New Zealand punting

References